The zygomatic branches of the facial nerve (malar branches) are nerves of the face. They run across the zygomatic bone to the lateral angle of the orbit. Here, they supply the orbicularis oculi muscle, and join with filaments from the lacrimal nerve and the zygomaticofacial branch of the maxillary nerve (CN V2).

Structure 
The zygomatic branches of the facial nerve are branches of the facial nerve (CN VII). They run across the zygomatic bone to the lateral angle of the orbit. This is deep to zygomaticus major muscle. They send fibres to orbicularis oculi muscle.

Connections 
The zygomatic branches of the facial nerve have many nerve connections. Along their course, there may be connections with the buccal branches of the facial nerve. They join with filaments from the lacrimal nerve and the zygomaticofacial nerve from the maxillary nerve (CN V2). They also join with the inferior palpebral nerve and the superior labial nerve, both from the infraorbital nerve.

Function 
The zygomatic branches of the facial nerve supply part of the orbicularis oculi muscle. This is used to close the eyelid.

Clinical significance

Testing 
To test the zygomatic branches of the facial nerve, a patient is asked to close their eyes tightly. This uses orbicularis oculi muscle. The zygomatic branches of the facial nerve may be recorded and stimulated with an electrode.

Surgical damage 
Rarely, the zygomatic branches of the facial nerve may be damaged during surgery on the temporomandibular joint (TMJ).

Additional images

See also 
 Zygomatic nerve
 Zygomaticus major muscle
 Zygomaticus minor muscle

References

External links
  - "Branches of Facial Nerve (CN VII)"
 
 
 http://www.dartmouth.edu/~humananatomy/figures/chapter_47/47-5.HTM

Facial nerve